Edward A. Barbour Jr. was an American Democratic politician and lawyer who served in the Missouri General Assembly.  He served in the Missouri Senate from 1935 until 1943 and in the Missouri House of Representatives from 1923 until 1925.

Barbour was educated at public schools of Springfield, Missouri, Drury College, University of Missouri, and Washington University School of Law in St. Louis.  During World War I, he served at the Adjutant General Department of Camp McArthur at Waco, Texas.

References

External links
 The Political Graveyard: Index to Politicians, Barbour

20th-century American politicians
Democratic Party Missouri state senators
Washington University in St. Louis alumni
Washington University School of Law alumni
Drury University alumni
University of Missouri alumni